Isaac Henry Sedric Fontaine IV (born April 16, 1975) is an American former professional basketball player. Born in Sacramento, California, he played collegiately at Washington State University. He played in the NBA for the Memphis Grizzlies during the 2001–02 season, playing six games. The following season, in 2002–03, he played with the Mobile Revelers of the NBA Development League.

References

External links
NBA stats @ basketball-reference.com

1975 births
Living people
Alaska Aces (PBA) players
American expatriate basketball people in France
American expatriate basketball people in China
American expatriate basketball people in Italy
American expatriate basketball people in the Philippines
American men's basketball players
Basketball players from Sacramento, California
Connecticut Pride players
Huntsville Flight players
La Crosse Bobcats players
Memphis Grizzlies players
Mobile Revelers players
Philippine Basketball Association imports
Shooting guards
SLUC Nancy Basket players
Undrafted National Basketball Association players
Victoria Libertas Pallacanestro players
Washington State Cougars men's basketball players
Zhejiang Golden Bulls players
Shell Turbo Chargers players